Berkheya carlinopsis Welw. ex O.Hoffm. is a Southern African herb or subshrub belonging to the family Asteraceae (Compositae) and was first described in 1896 in Boletim da Sociedade Broteriana 13 34.

The genus Berkheya was created by the German botanist Jakob Friedrich Ehrhart in 1788 and was in honour of Dutch botanist, Johannes le Francq van Berkhey (1729–1812) -  'carlinopsis' alludes to Carlina, a genus closely resembling Berkheya.

References

Vernonioideae